Professional Rapper is the third full-length album by John Reuben.  It was released on December 2, 2003.

Track listing
"Move"
"Have No Opinion?"
"I Haven't Been Myself" (featuring Adie)
"Life Is Short"
"Treats"
"Freedom to Feel"
"Time to Leave"
"Re-Record"
"Jammin' John & Mixin' Manny"
"All In All" (featuring Tim Skipper from House of Heroes)
"5 Years to Write"
"Higher"

References

2003 albums
John Reuben albums
Gotee Records albums